Mor Shushan (born 4 November 1988) is a former Israeli footballer. Mor is the brother of Ron Shushan who plays as a goalkeeper.

External links

1988 births
Living people
Israeli footballers
Hapoel Nof HaGalil F.C. players
Hapoel Tel Aviv F.C. players
Maccabi Herzliya F.C. players
Bnei Sakhnin F.C. players
Hapoel Bnei Lod F.C. players
Liga Leumit players
Israeli Premier League players
Footballers from Haifa
Israeli people of Moroccan-Jewish descent
Association football defenders